Guillaume Leclerc (born 20 February 1996) is a French ice hockey player for Brûleurs de Loups and the French national team.

He represented France at the 2019 IIHF World Championship.

References

External links

1996 births
Living people
Brûleurs de Loups players
French expatriate ice hockey people
French expatriate sportspeople in the United States
French ice hockey forwards
Madison Capitols players
HK Poprad players
Sportspeople from Besançon
UMass Lowell River Hawks men's ice hockey players
French expatriate sportspeople in Slovakia
French expatriate sportspeople in Slovenia
French expatriate sportspeople in Germany
French expatriate sportspeople in Denmark
French expatriate sportspeople in Sweden
French expatriate sportspeople in Hungary
Expatriate ice hockey players in the United States
Expatriate ice hockey players in Slovakia
Expatriate ice hockey players in Slovenia
Expatriate ice hockey players in Germany
Expatriate ice hockey players in Denmark
Expatriate ice hockey players in Sweden
Expatriate ice hockey players in Hungary